Jolly Life is a 2009  Turkish comedy film, written and directed by Yılmaz Erdoğan, about a working class Turkish man who accepts a job as a Mall Santa. It was one of the highest-grossing Turkish films of 2009. The cast are actors of Çok Güzel Hareketler Bunlar. Due to filming was done simultaneously for two productions, The actors have minor roles. Writer, director and star Erdoğan says that the main character is between the worlds of the Westernized upper class Turks and the working class Turks in the east of the country.

See also 
 2009 in film
 Turkish films of 2009

References

External links
 
 

2009 films
2000s Turkish-language films
Films set in Turkey
2009 comedy films
Turkish comedy films